Кто хочет стать миллионером? (English translation: Who Wants To Be A Millionaire?, transliteration: Kto khochet stat' millionerom?) is a Russian game show based on the original British format of Who Wants to Be a Millionaire?. The show is hosted by Dmitry Dibrov (earlier by Maxim Galkin). The main goal of the game is to win 3 million Russian roubles (originally 1 million Russian roubles) by answering 15 multiple-choice questions correctly. There are five lifelines: Ask the Host (помощь ведущегo, pomoshch' vedushchego), Fifty Fifty (50 на 50, 50 na 50), Double Dip (право на ошибку, pravo na oshibku), Phone A Friend (звонок другу, zvonok drugu), and Switch the Question (замена вопроса, zamena voprosa).

Кто хочет стать миллионером? is broadcast from February 19, 2001, to today. It is shown by on the Russian TV station Channel One on Saturdays at 6:45 PM. The show is set in a high-risk format, where contestants choose one safety net, if they get the question wrong prior to the milestone, they will leave with nothing.

Broadcast history 
The Russian version of the series premiered on October 1, 1999, on NTV. Initially, the program was called, "O, schastlivchik!" ("Oh, Lucky Man!"), presented by Dmitry Dibrov. The game combines the simplicity of the rules to provide an opportunity to win the top prize of 1 million rubles. The series gained enormous popularity among Russian audiences, and in 2000, was awarded a Taffy award for Best Entertainment Program.

On February 19, 2001, the program moved to channel ORT (Channel One) and was renamed to its current title to reflect the name of the franchise. Dibrov departed the show, and was succeeded by comedian Maxim Galkin. On September 17, 2005, the money tree was revised, with the top prize now worth 3 million rubles.

On December 21, 2008, Dibrov returned to hosting the show once more and presented the show ever since.

Payout structure

Old game's version 

Earlier, the game was called О, счастливчик! (O Lucky Man!) and it was shown on NTV.

It was broadcast from October 1, 1999, to January 27, 2001. It was shown on the Russian TV station NTV. In 2001, the show was superseded by a second adoption named Кто хочет стать миллионером? and aired on public Russian broadcaster Channel One. For a while TNT broadcast reruns of О, счастливчик! episodes.

Special Events 
 The first game was shown a special project for a few days before the new year 2000. The game was attended by leading NTV journalists and Leonid Parfyonov, Andrey Norkin, Vladimir Kara-Murza, Victor Shenderovich, Lev Novozhenov, Yevgeny Kiselyov, Alexander Belyayev and others. In the same game was born the concept of «zone of Shenderovich» - questions after the sixth and the «zone of the Kara-Murza» - after the tenth question.
 A month before the 2000 presidential election in a game attended by the four presidential candidates: Stanislav Govorukhin, Ella Pamfilova, Yevgeny Savostyanov and Umar Dzhabrailov.
 At the end of the first season held a special issue devoted to the eighth birthday of the tax police in Moscow, which was attended by employees of departments.
 A few months before the New Year 2000, the production team conducted a poll among the audience, whom they would like to see in New Year's special edition of the game. The poll has been won for Russia's on-going President Vladimir Putin, but for obvious reasons, he refused to participate, but he sent a letter. The New Year's special was attended by prominent journalists, politicians and artists: Svetlana Sorokina, Sergey Shoigu, Vladimir Zhirinovsky, Detsl, etc. When Svetlana Sorokina ended her game, she offered the host, Dmitriy Dibrov, to switch places, and he failed to answer the eleventh question correctly and won 32,000 rubles.

Notable contestants

Top Prize Winners 
 Igor Sazeev (Игорь Сазеев) from Saint Petersburg. (12 March 2001)
 Irina Chudinovskikh and Yuriy Chudinovskikh (Ирина Чудиновских и Юрий Чудиновских) from Kirov. (January 18, 2003)
 Svetlana Yaroslavtseva (Светлана Ярославцева) from Troitsk. (February 19, 2006)
 Timur Budayev (Тимур Будаев) from Pyatigorsk. (April 17, 2010)
 Bari Alibasov and Alexander «Danko» Fadeev (Бари Алибасов и Александр «Данко» Фадеев). (November 23, 2013)
 Yulianna Karaulova and Timur Solovyov (Юлианна Караулова и Тимур Соловьев). (December 2, 2017)

Top Prize Losers 
 Galina Semyonova (Галина Семёнова) lost 468,000 rubles on January 22, 2005.
 Vladimir Yefremov (Владимир Ефремов) lost 700,000 rubles on April 30, 2011.
 Dušan Perović and Yekaterina Andreyeva (Душан Перович и Екатерина Андреева) lost 1,100,000 oubles on April 1, 2017.
 Viktor Verzhbitskiy and Andrey Burkovskiy (Виктор Вержбицкий и Андрей Бурковский) lost 1,300,000 rubles on May 27, 2017.
 Viktor Vasilyev and Gavriil Gordeyev (Виктор Васильев и Гавриил Гордеев) lost 1,100,000 rubles on November 11, 2017.
 Keti Topuria and Vladimir Miklosich (Кэти Топурия и Владимир Миклошич) lost 1,300,000 rubles on February 17, 2018.
 Alexander Druz and Viktor Sidnev (Александр Друзь и Виктор Сиднев) lost 1,300,000 rubles on December 22, 2018. (Druz cheated.)
 Irina Pudova and Vasilisa Volodina (Ирина Пудова и Василиса Володина) lost 1,100,000 rubles on October 9, 2021.
 Anna Mishina and Gennady Smirnov (Анна Мишина и Геннадий Смирнов) lost 1,100,000 rubles on December 11, 2021.

Top Prize Walkers 
 Sergey Strokin (Сергей  Строкин) from Moscow - June 10, 2000 = 500,000 rubles
 Gennadiy Sostrovchuk - November 24, 2001 = 500,000 rubles
 Konstantin Fedchenko - December 10, 2001 = 500,000 rubles
 Olga Krayushkina - November 4, 2002 = 500,000 rubles
 Leonid Agutin  and Anzhelika Varum - January 8, 2005 = 500,000 rubles
 Valentin Smirnitsky  (Валентин Смирни́тский) - March 6, 2005 = 500,000 rubles
 Sergey Bobris (Сергей Бобрис) from Belgorod. (February 5, 2011) = 1,500,000 rubles
 Aleksandr Kuzin (Александр Кузин) from Oryol. (March 24, 2012) = 1,500,000 rubles
 Leonid Panyukov (Леонид Панюков) from Kostroma. (September 29, 2012) = 1,500,000 rubles
 Mikhail Boyarsky and Valentin Smirnitsky (Михаил Боярский и Валентин Смирни́тский). (May 16, 2015) = 1,500,000 rubles
 Dana Borisova and Alexander Gudkov (Дана Борисова и Александр Гудков). (June 24, 2018) = 1,500,000 rubles
 Anna Kamenkova and Yury Grymov (Анна Каменкова и Юрий Гримов). (August 18, 2018) = 1,500,000 rubles
 Ilia Averbukh and Roman Kostomarov (Илья Авербух и Роман Костомаров). (March 23, 2019) = 1,500,000 rubles
 Victoria Lopyreva and Mikhail Grushevsky (Виктория Лоприева и Михаил Грушевский). (December 21, 2019) = 1,500,000 rubles
 Anton Komolov and Viktor Vasilyev (Антон Комолов и Виктор Васильев). (January 8, 2020)

800,000 rubles winners 

 Alexander Lazarev and Alexander Lazarev-Jr. (March 5, 2006)
 Valery Garkalin (March 26, 2006)
 Yana Churikova and Yury Aksyuta (December 23, 2007)
 Sergey Ivanov (September 19, 2009)
 Vladimir Kruzhalov (September 4, 2010)
 Vladimir Yefremov (April 30, 2011)
 Olga Tuktareva and Galina Koneva (June 11, 2011)
 Vladimir Orlov (July 30, 2011)
 Maria Kozhevnikova and Vyacheslav Fetisov (December 17, 2011)
 Vladimir Korenev and Alexander Goloborodko (February 11, 2012)
 Darya Poverennova and Oleg Maslennikov-Voytov (February 18, 2012)
 Lev Durov and Yekaterina Durova (February 24, 2013)
 Valery Barinov and Lidiya Fedoseyeva-Shukshina (March 9, 2013)
 Vladimir Menshov and Yuliya Menshova (October 5, 2013)
 Gennady Khazanov and Anna Bolshova (January 3, 2014)
 Vladimir Menshov and Anatoly Lobotsky (September 20, 2014)
 Dana Borisova and Stanislav Kostyushkin (November 22, 2014)
 Yelena Vorobey and Nikolay Lukinsky (April 4, 2015)
 Viktor Vasilyev and Dmitry Khrustalyov (January 30, 2016)
 Maxim Potashov and Nikolay Valuyev (February 21, 2016)
 Natalya Barbier and Timur Solovyov (November 12, 2016)
 Alexander Maslyakov-Jr. and Alexander Maslyakov (February 4, 2017)
 Vladimir Pozner and Mikhail Boyarsky (February 11, 2017)
 Yury Nikolayev and Rovshan Askerov (September 16, 2017)
 Alla Mikheyeva and Ilya Averbukh (September 30, 2017)
 Darya Rubinskaya and Olga Bykova (December 30, 2017)
 Yana Poplavskaya and Alexander Polovtsev (April 14, 2018)
 Dmitry Khrustalev and Yelena Borshcheva (April 21, 2018)
 Mikhail Grushevsky and Anna Gorshkova (July 15, 2018)
 Stanislav Mereminsky and Nikolay Krapil (August 25, 2018)
 Anatoly Zhuravlev and Valentina Legkostupova (September 7, 2019)
 Mikhail Marfin and Dmitry Khrustalev (November 2, 2019)
 Alexander Zhulin and Boris Smolkin (March 14, 2020)
 Valeriya Lanskaya and Alena Sviridova (May 4, 2021)
 Alexander Samoylenko and Klim Shipenko (October 2, 2021)
 Alena Mordovina and Aleksey Dudin (October 2, 2021)

References

External links 
Official website of the new version
Behind the scenes of Russian Millionaire

Who Wants to Be a Millionaire?
Russian game shows
Russian television series based on British television series
1999 Russian television series debuts
2001 Russian television series endings
2001 Russian television series debuts